Gustavo Wáshington Ferreyra Briozzo (born 29 May 1972) is a Uruguayan retired footballer and manager.

Club career
Ferreyra spent most of his career playing for Central Español and Peñarol in the Primera División Uruguaya.

International career
Ferreyra made five appearances for the senior Uruguay national football team during 1991.

References

 

1972 births
Living people
Uruguayan footballers
Uruguayan expatriate footballers
Uruguay under-20 international footballers
Uruguay international footballers
1991 Copa América players
Uruguayan Primera División players
Central Español players
Peñarol players
Deportivo Saprissa players
Expatriate footballers in Costa Rica
Footballers from Montevideo
Association football forwards